Samuel Yves Oum Gwet (born 14 December 1997), known as Samuel Gouet, is a Cameroonian professional footballer who plays as a midfielder for Belgian club Mechelen.

Club career
On 23 June 2021, Gouet signed a three-year contract with Mechelen in Belgium.

International career
On 9 October 2020, Gouet made his international debut for Cameroon in a friendly match against Japan. Gouet was one of the 26 players that are called up for the 2022 FIFA World Cup.

References

External links

1997 births
Living people
Cameroonian footballers
Association football midfielders
Cameroon international footballers
2021 Africa Cup of Nations players
2022 FIFA World Cup players
SC Rheindorf Altach players
K.V. Mechelen players
Austrian Football Bundesliga players
Belgian Pro League players
Cameroonian expatriate footballers
Cameroonian expatriate sportspeople in Austria
Expatriate footballers in Austria
Cameroonian expatriate sportspeople in Belgium
Expatriate footballers in Belgium
People from Centre Region (Cameroon)
Cameroon A' international footballers
2016 African Nations Championship players